Sparsha  is a 2000 Indian Kannada-language romance film written and directed by Sunil Kumar Desai. It stars Sudeep, Rekha and Sudha Rani. Naveen Mayur, Sihi Kahi Chandru, Kashi, Umashree and Vanishree feature in supporting roles.

Upon theatrical release on 23 July 2000, the film opened to widespread positive response from critics and filmgoers. However, the screening had to be stopped after bandh was called for in most towns and cities and towns of Karnataka following the abduction of Rajkumar, the Kannada actor, in July 2000, thereby affecting the film's collections. After normality resumed, the film completed a 100-day run in theatres.

Plot
Sudeep (Sudeep) is a film actor and model. He falls in love with Suma (Rekha) during a film shoot in Ooty. They meet each other, share their views and Sudeep meets with Suma's family.
Some incidents educate Sudeep that those who make mistakes they themselves correct and apologise next, when Sudeep rushing to see off his lover at the Ooty railway station, accidentally knocks an unknown young woman, Radha (Sudha Rani), into the path of a moving train. Radha does not see who knocked her over, but only catches a glimpse of the jacket he wears. The accident causes her to lose a leg, as well as the love of her fiancée.
Sudeep rushes to the accident spot and takes her to the hospital. He takes care of her, but refrains from telling both Radha and Suma that he was responsible for the accident. To avoid the consequences, Sudeep offers to marry Radha. Suma is hurt by his sudden change of heart, but accepts his decision. Radha accepts his offer too, but continues to hunt for the man who knocked her over. But yet, how the truths unfold forms the rest of the story.

Cast

 Sudeep as Sudeep
 Rekha as Suma
 Sudha Rani as Radha 
 Naveen Mayur
 Sihi Kahi Chandru
 Kashi
 Umashree
 Anupam
 Vanishree as Mangala
 Jayaram
 Kishori Ballal
 Vidya Murthy
 Ramya
 Rekhamrutha
 Jayashree Raj
 Tharakesh Patel
 Bijjal
 Prithviraj
 Pushpa Swamy
 Radha Ramachandra
 Malathi Saroj
 Shailaja Somashekar
 Ayyappa

Production
Prior to Sparsha, Sudeep had appeared in minor roles in Thayavva (1997) and Prathyartha (1999). The director of the latter film, Sunil Kumar Desai, was roped to direct Sparsha by Sudeep's father Sarovar Sanjeev, who produced the film under the banner Sarovar Productions. Filming which began in early 2000 had to be stopped a few days into, after Sudeep fell ill from typhoid. He "lost weight" and "looked haggard" before the shooting resumed. Filming took place for a period of 99 days in Bangalore, Hyderabad, Darjeeling, Ooty, Kushalnagar and Chikmagalur.

Soundtrack

Hamsalekha scored for the film and its soundtracks, also penning lyrics for the soundtrack with Shyamsundar Kulkarni, M. N. Vyasarao, Itagi Eeranna, Doddarange Gowda and R. N. Jayagopal. The album consists of eight tracks and was distributed in the market by Akash Audio.

Release and response
The film was released theatrically on 23 July 2000. After a run in Karnataka, it was 'specially' screened in parts of Tamil Nadu and Andhra Pradesh. Between 2001 and 2002, it was screened in various parts of the United States.

The film received mixed to positive reviews from critics upon release. M. D. Riti reviewed the film for Rediff.com and wrote, "Desai relies largely on music to carry this film through. But the music is, of course, of a very different genre: it is soft, melodious and full of Kannada shayari." Despite rating the film well, she felt that it lacked the "special appeal that Desai's earlier films, Beladingala Baale and Nishkarsha had". She further wrote, "Where Sparsha seems to fall short is in the acting skills of its lead pair. Rekha comes across as rather wooden, while Sudeep certainly has the chocolate box good looks that his role calls for, but fails to deliver any powerful histrionics." Adding to it, she rated the music highly before concluding writing, " If only the stars had had more charisma or talent, this film by Desai might have made him even better remembered than his past ventures." The reviewer for Screen felt that it was a "touching, gripping, captivating and worth-watching film only for the last half an hour." They added Desai's "touch of dexterity is ... missing in some places. His usual verve and agility is not found in this film." They called the music "pleasant to the ears with three songs scored melodiously", editing "jerky" and that the "cinematography by Venu is the high point of the film". Performances of the leading pair, Sudeep and Rekha, were commended in that they "show promise".

Awards and nominations
2000–01 Karnataka State Film Awards
 Best Lyricist — Itagi Eeranna

48th Filmfare Awards South
 Best Film
 Best Director — Sunil Kumar Desai
 Best Actress — Sudha Rani

Film Fan's Association Awards – Kannada
 Best Film
 Best Actor — Sudeep
 Best Supporting Actress — Sudharani

Cinema Express Awards
 Best Film – Kannada
 Best Director — Sunil Kumar Desai

2001 Asianet Kaveri Film Awards
 Best Director — Sunil Kumar Desai
 Best New Face of The Year (Male) — Sudeep
 Best New Face of The Year (Female) — Rekha
 Best Cameraman — H. C. Venugopal
 Best Music Director — Hamsalekha (also for Shabdavedhi)
 Best Lyricist — Hamsalekha (also for Shabdavedhi, Yajamana and Preethse)

2000 Videocon–Suprabhata Awards
 Best Film
 Best Director — Sunil Kumar Desai
 Best Newcomer Actor — Sudeep
 Best Newcomer Actress — Rekha
 Best Cinematographer — H. C. Venugopal
 Best Editor — R. Janardhan

The Karnataka Welfare Association For Blind
 Award — Sudeep

References

External links 
 

2000s Kannada-language films
2000 films
Indian romantic drama films
Films scored by Hamsalekha
Films directed by Sunil Kumar Desai
Indian romantic thriller films